The SNCASO SO.3050 was designed and built in France towards the end of World War II. Only one was completed and that was soon abandoned.

Design and development
The SO.3050 was designed in occupied France during World War II and was the first French two seat tourer to fly after the Liberation. It was a conventional low wing cantilever monoplane, powered by a  Renault 4Pei air-cooled inverted four cylinder inline engine. Pilot and passenger sat side by side under multipart glazing which ran rearwards into the raised upper fuselage. This raised region dropped away towards the tail, where the tailplane was mounted on top of the fuselage. The vertical tail was straight edged but with a broad rounded top and a curved fillet to merge it into the fuselage. The tourer had a fixed tailwheel undercarriage with faired legs and spats; the tailwheel castored.

The first flight took place on 13 March 1945 from Bordeaux-Merignac, piloted by Fernand Lefebre. It was not developed and was soon abandoned.

Specifications

References

1940s French sport aircraft
SO.3050
Low-wing aircraft
Single-engined tractor aircraft
Aircraft first flown in 1945